Elizabeth Pitts Merrill Palmer (Oct. 8, 1838 – July 28, 1916) was an American philanthropist whose bequest founded the Merrill-Palmer Institute in Detroit. She was also a founder of the Michigan Humane Society, active in the women's suffrage movement, and a benefactor of the Detroit Institute of Arts.

Life
Palmer née Merrill was born October 8, 1838 in Portland, Maine. She was the only child of Charles Merrill a lumber owner and Frances (Pitts) Merrill. In 1855 she married Thomas W. Palmer with whom she adopted two children. and the couple settled outside what were then the boundaries of Detroit (but within its current boundaries).  Thomas W. Palmer was a U.S. Senator from 1883–1889 and U.S. Minister to Spain in 1889–1890.

Palmer and her husband used their wealth the benefit Michigan. They supported the Detroit Institute of Art (which now stands on the former site of their home), the Michigan branch of the Society for the Prevention of Cruelty to Animals, the University of Michigan, and the YMCA.

In 1893 the Palmers donated land to Detroit that became Palmer Park. After her husband's death in 1913 Palmer devoted herself to founding, endowing and maintaining a school to be known as the Merrill-Palmer Motherhood and Home Training School. The School was established in 1920 as the Freer House to serve Detroit's children through formal academic programs in infant, toddler, child and adolescent development, and in family functioning.

Palmer died July 28, 1916 in Great Neck, Long Island.

Legacy
In 1980 the Freer House School was incorporated into Wayne State University. It is now known as the Merrill-Palmer Skillman Institute.

References

External links

1838 births
1916 deaths
American suffragists
Spouses of Michigan politicians
19th-century American philanthropists
People from Detroit